Monika Antonelli (born February 17, 1959) is a voice actress and librarian best known for voicing Puar and Chiaotzu in the Dragon Ball anime series, as well as earlier video games and other media for the franchise from 1999 to 2008. Before Dragon Ball, she was a librarian for the Denton Public Library in Denton, Texas and was the voice of the library's mascot, Whiffles the Bunny.

Antonelli currently resides in Mankato, Minnesota.

Voice roles

Television series
Dragon Ball - Puar, Chiaotzu, Pudding, Cupcake, Turbo Norimaki, Additional Voices
Dragon Ball Z - Chiaotzu, Puar, Chiko, Additional Voices
Dragon Ball Z: The History of Trunks'' - Puar 
Dragon Ball GT - Puar, Chiaotzu (Flashbacks)
Dragon Ball GT: A Hero's Legacy - Chiaotzu, Puar

Movies
Dragon Ball: Sleeping Princess in Devil's Castle - Puar, Launch (Nice Form)
Dragon Ball: Mystical Adventure - Chiaotzu, Puar
Dragon Ball: The Path to Power - Puar
Dragon Ball Z: The Tree of Might - Chiaotzu, Puar
Dragon Ball Z: Bojack Unbound - Chiaotzu, Puar
Dragon Ball Z: The History of Trunks - Puar

Video games
Dragon Ball Z: Budokai (series)- Chiaotzu, Puar
Dragon Ball Z: Budokai Tenkaichi (series)- Chiaotzu, Puar

References

External links

 

American video game actresses
American voice actresses
People from Denton, Texas
1959 births
Living people
Place of birth missing (living people)
American librarians
American women librarians
21st-century American women